Lorenzo Olarte Cullen (born 8 December 1932) is a local Canarian politician and lawyer. He is a former president of the Canary island Automous region but served only 3 years of his 4 years term.

Olarte is awarded the Gran Cruz de San Raimundo de Peñafort, the highest honor for a Spanish jurist, the Gran Cruz del Mérito Civil, created by the Spanish King Alfonso XIII, recognizes the services of Spanish and foreign citizens on behalf of Spain, the Gran Cruz del Mérito Militar, for his collaboration in the decolonization of the former Spanish Sahara, the Alfonso X el Sabio, for his contribution to the development of Education and the Gran Collar de las Islas Canarias, the highest honor in the Canary Islands.

After the ban on bullfighting in Catalonia, Olarte argued that the 1991 Canarian law of animal protection did not forbid bullfighting against what was being claimed.

References

1932 births
Living people
People from Ponteareas
Democratic and Social Centre (Spain) politicians
Canarian Coalition politicians
Presidents of the Canary Islands
Canarian Roman Catholics